Carter-Campbell of Possil (also known as Campbell of Possil) is a branch of Clan Campbell, a Scottish clan. Historically, they are part of Clan Campbell, which was regarded as one of the largest Scottish clans. The branch of the Campbell clan was historically centred in Lawers. Some of the clan, which originated with the original Campbells, had links to the lands of Argyll.

The family originates from two notable Scottish families. The Campbells of Possil were originally part of Clan Campbell, and located in Argyll; and the Carters were an Irish family, noted for their political involvement in the 18th century in Ireland. The Carter-Campbell name was first used in 1864, following marriage.

Since the marriage there have been a number of notable Carter-Campbell descendants, including Duncan Carter-Campbell of Possil OBE and George Carter-Campbell. Many of the Carter-Campbells in recent history have held high ranking positions within the British military.

Origins

Campbells of Possil
The Campbells of Possil's first origin in Scotland is in the area of Argyll, archaically Argyle ( in modern Gaelic), which is a region of western Scotland. The family is an extended branch of the Campbells of Kinloch and also the Campbells of Murthlie. These both have origins from the Campbells of Lawers.

Their links to the area of Argyll brought the original Campbells into problems in western Scotland, when Clan Campbell and Clan MacDougall had ongoing conflicts. Their regularly conflicts eventually resulted in the Battle of Red Ford. The battle took place in 1294, which resulted in the death of Sir Colin Campbell, who is said to be one of the first recognised Campbells in the Argyll region of Scotland. John MacDougall of Argyll is said to have led Clan MacDougall during the battle.

The battle resulted in various Clan Campbell branches having ongoing feuds with Clan MacDougall. Both Clan Campbell and Clan MacDougall had influences in the region of Argyll, which meant there were ongoing feuds between the Scottish clans.

The clan is directly descended from Sir Colin Campbell of Glenorchy, a Scottish nobleman born in the 15th century. Towards the end of the Middle Ages, a number of Campbells reached positions of power within Scotland, while under the reign of King James II. This continued into the reigns of King James III and also James IV of Scotland, where many Campbells became Earls of Argyll.

Carters
The Carter family originally descended from Thomas Carter, an Irish MP and are known as a political family. He was elected as an MP to the Irish House of Commons and became Second Sergeant at Arms being returned first for Fethard and then for Portarlington.

His son also called Thomas Carter, was born in 1690. He was the first occupier of Castlemartin which he acquired in 1729, and was made Master of the Rolls in Ireland in 1731. Thomas Carter was succeeded at Castlemartin by his second son Henry Boyle Carter, who was named after his father's friend and political ally, Speaker Boyle.

In 1750 Henry married Susanna Shaen, widow of James Wynne, daughter of Sir Arthur Shaen, 2nd baronet, and his Catholic wife Susanna Magan, by whom Henry had three sons and one daughter.

History

Early history
Sir Colin Campbell of Glenorchy was the second Earl of Argyll in 1457, after succeeding his grandfather, Duncan Campbell. After serving as Earl of Argyll, he became Lord Lorne in 1470. He became an earl after supporting King James II, against the Black Douglases. Colin Campbell was the first Campbell earl in a list of Campbell Earls, who remained as Earls of Argyll until 1641.

17th century and civil war

During the 17th century there were a number of Large Scottish Battles, which took place between 1644 and 1651.

The Campbell of Possil's first major involvement was at the Battle of Inverlochy in 1645. During this period, Clan Campbell and Clan Lamont fought in various battles across Scotland. Following the battle, Clan Lamont used the opportunity to destroy much of the Clan Campbell's territory in the area. This resulted in a backlash from Clan Campbell, and the Scottish clan took both Castle Toward and Castle Ascog from Clan Lamont as a result. Clan Chief James Lamont surrendered, and Clan Campbell burned both castles to the ground. This period of conflict became known as the Dunoon Massacre.

Between 1647 and 1698, the Clan Campbell and Clan MacLean fought numerous battles around the area of Argyll, where many of the Campbell of Possil ancestors were located. In 1647, members of Clan Campbell were defeated at Duart Castle, during a battle by Royalist troops of Clan MacLean. In 1678, Archibald Campbell, 9th Earl of Argyll, son of the Marquess of Argyll invaded the Isle of Mull and took land from Clan MacLean.

Years after the invasion of the Isle of Mull, members of the Campbell of Possil family invaded Duart Castle in 1691 along with Archibald Campbell, 1st Duke of Argyll. The Castle was surrendered by Sir John Maclean, 4th Baronet. The Castle was subsequently demolished, by Clan Campbell and eventually included as part of the Torosay Castle estate. It remained as a ruin until it was rebuilt in the 19th century.

19th century and formation of Carter-Campbell
In the early 19th century, commissioned David Bryce to build Torosay Castle for the Campbell of Possil family.

The two land owning families were the Carters of Castle Martin and the Campbells of Possil. The Carters of Castle Martin had origins in the region of County Kildare, Ireland and this is where most of their land was located. The Campbells of Possil owned large areas of land throughout Lanarkshire.

The marriage took place between Colonel Thomas Tupper Carter and Emily Georgina Campbell of Possil IV, who was granddaughter of Colonel Alexander Campbell of Possil. Once married, their matrimonial home was the Fascadale estate, Ardrishaig, Argyllshire. Emily Georgina Campbell of Possil IV wished to retain her surname when the marriage took place, which resulted in the formation of the Carter-Campbell name.

Following the marriage in 1864, the family of Carter-Campbell was formed after the union of the two land owning families. Following the union of these two families their Armorial Bearings of the two families was merged in 1864. The Lord Lyon King of Arms in Scotland officially formed the Carter-Campbell of Possil Armorial Bearings.

In late 1857 Carter joined the company's Royal Bengal Engineers and was promoted to first lieutenant on 27 August 1858.

In 1861, Carter served in the Sikkim Expedition. In 1863, he commanded the engineer forces in the Umbeyla Campaign. On 21 April 1864, Carter was appointed a 3rd Grade surveyor in Great Trigonometric Survey of India. Later that year, on 15 September, he was married to Emily Georgina Campbell of Possil, the daughter of General George Campbell of Inverniell and he adopted the new name of Carter-Campbell of Possil.

Carter served in the 1868 Expedition to Abyssinia where, upon the death of H. W. Garnault, he was promoted to captain on 13 September 1870.

On 1 October 1877 Carter was promoted to major in the Royal Engineers, and made lieutenant colonel on 11 December 1886. He retired in 1887 upon receiving the honorary rank of colonel.

Carter lived for a time at Siam House, Weymouth, Dorset. In 1893 he was granted renewed arms by the Lord Lyon King of Arms, and formally changed his name to Carter-Campbell of Possil.

He subsequently lived with his wife and children at the family residence of Fascadale, in the parish of South Knapdale in Strathclyde (now Ardrishaig, Lochgilphead, Argyllshire).

20th century onwards

On 14 January 1900 Carter died at Fascadale, aged 61.

The family had other military involvements during the same period and beyond. Carter had six children, his son George Carter-Campbell served in World War I and became a major general. Duncan Carter-Campbell of Possil was another of Carter's sons, and was a British Army Colonel during the 1950s.

Clan profile

Motto

Translated from its Latin as "Do and Hope"

Fac et Spera

Notable bearers
The notable bearers included:

Crests and coats of arms

Tartans

The tartans attributed to the family:

Estates

Torosay Castle, Isle of Mull
The Castle was built by the architect David Bryce for John Campbell of Possil. The castle was built in Scottish Baronial style, and completed in 1858.

7 years after the construction of the castle, it was sold by John Campbell, to the wealthy businessman Arburthnot Charles Guthrie. The castle was sold in 1865. The castle was later sold to the Guthrie family, and is now commonly acknowledged as the seat for Clan Guthrie.

John Campbell of Possil (nicknamed "The Dragoon") who was the son of Colonel Alexander Campbell of Possil, employed architect, David Bryce, and built the castle on the Isle of Mull on the Torosay estate after acquiring it from his father in 1858. The armorial bearings of the Campbells of Possil and the Crest, as shown above, are carved in stone and displayed on each elevation of the castle walls.

The Carter-Campbell family sold Torosay Castle in 1865. John Campbell of Possil sold the castle and the estate to Arburthnot Charles Guthrie, a wealthy London businessman. Torosay Castle is still standing, and in 2008 was the location where a priceless bottle of Veuve Clicquot champagne was found in the Castle. It was regarded as priceless by many, and is now on show display at the Veuve Clicquot visitor centre in Reims, France.

Duart Castle
Duart Castle was originally built in the 13th century, and was part of Clan MacLean. in 1350, Lachlan Lubanach Maclean of Duart was given the Castle as her dowry. The Clan Campbell's first involvement was an attack in 1647, and Archibald Campbell, 9th Earl of Argyll finally captured the Castle in 1691. The Castle was then demolished, leaving the Castle in ruin. Large bricks from the ruins of the Castle were used by Donald Maclean, 5th Laird of Torloisk, to build a cottage for his family close to the Castle. By 1751, the castle has been abandoned and was officially part of the Torosay Castle estate. 

Descendants of Archibald Campbell, 1st Duke of Argyll sold the castle in 1801. It was purchased by Clan MacQuarrie, before it was sold to Carter-Campbell of Possil, who kept the Castle as a ruin in the Torosay estate. When the estate was sold, the Castle ruin was purchased by Sir Fitzroy Donald Maclean and restored.

Possil Estate

A region known as Nether Possil was acquired by Robert Crawford in 1595. From this point onwards, the estate was sold between various wealthy Scottish families, until the writer John Forbes built a house in 1697. In 1808, the estate was acquired by Colonel Alexander Campbell, son of Glasgow merchant John Campbell senior, founder of the west Indian trading house of John Campbell sen. & Co. Colonel Campbell has served during the battles in South Africa, being present at the capture of the Cape of Good Hope in 1806, and at the Battle of Corunna where he commanded the 20th Regiment. Having bought the adjoining estate of Keppoch in 1838, the family seat had transferred there. Campbell rented Possil house and a park to Sir Archibald Alison, 1st Baronet, who as the lawyer son of Scottish writer Archibald Alison, had in 1834 become Sheriff of Lanarkshire.

The house and parts of the estate went on to become the Possilpark area of Glasgow.

Clan Campbell of Possil Family Mausoleum

The Clan Campbell of Possil has a family mausoleum, which is located in the Parkland within the grounds of Torosay Castle. A number of family members were buried there, following the purchase of the Torosay Estate in 1808. The following family members are buried at the mausoleum.

 Colonel Alexander Campbell of Possil - Following the purchase of the Estate in 1808, Campbell of Possil decided to build a family mausoleum. Following its construction, he was the first person to be buried there.
 Harriet Maclachlan - Married Alexander Campbell of Possil, and was laid to rest in the Campbell of Possil Family Mausoleum. Before marriage, she was part of Clan Maclachlan and the daughter of Donald Maclachlan.
 Mrs Alexander Campbell of Possil Née Harriet Maclachan of Castle Lachlan, Argyll (see Clan Maclachlan painted by Sir Henry Raeburn).
 John Campbell of Possil Esq. and of Torosay Castle (Duart House) The Achnacroish Estate, Isle of Mull and his three wives: Elizabeth Campbell of Ballimore, Helen Bogle Campbell of Colgrain and Elizabeth daughter of Donald Horne W.S.

References

Further reading
 A history of Clan Campbell, vol. 1: From origins to Flodden by Alastair Campbell of Airds Unicorn Pursuivant (pages 206, 209), books.google.co.uk
 
 The Island & Its People. By Jo Currie (pages 197, 225, 238, 256, 281, 310-312, 319, 326, 331, 332, 333, 366, 372, 384, 403)., books.google.com
 Kelvingrove Art Gallery and Museum Glasgow (Campbell family portraits by Sir Henry Raeburn), glasgowmuseums.com
 Fairbairn's Book of Crests of the Families of Great Britain and Ireland, genealogical.com
 The Irish Book of Arms: Armorial Bearings of Ireland and Her Families from the Earliest Times., books.google.co.uk

External links
 Carter-Campbell pages in Burke's Landed Gentry, books.google.com
 Craigenputtock website, residence of the Carter-Campbells, craigenputtock.eu
 Carter-Campbell of Possil page in Burke's Peerage and Gentry, burkes-peerage.net
 The Peerage.com
 The old country houses of the old Glasgow gentry: LXXXIII. Possil, gdl.cdlr.strath.ac.uk
 James Irvine-Robertson's Journal from 1845-1847 (Mull Diaries), jamesirvinerobertson.co.uk
 The Glasgow Story, John Campbell of John Campbell Snr & Co.
 The Glasgow Story, Mungo Nutter Campbell of Ballimore

Scottish families
British families
Clan Campbell
Clan Campbell branches